Fencing was contested at the 2019 Summer Universiade from 4 to 9 July 2019 at PalaUniSa in Baronissi.

Medal summary

Medal table

Men's events

Women's events

References

External links
2019 Summer Universiade – Fencing
Results Book – Fencing (Archived version)

 
Universiade
2019 Summer Universiade events
Fencing at the Summer Universiade
International fencing competitions hosted by Italy